The 1981 World Junior Figure Skating Championships were held on December 8–14, 1980 in London, Ontario, Canada. Commonly called "World Juniors" and "Junior Worlds", the event determined the World Junior champions in the disciplines of men's singles, ladies' singles, pair skating, and ice dancing.

Results

Men

Ladies

Pairs

Ice dancing

References

World Junior Figure Skating Championships, 1981
World Junior Figure Skating Championships, 1982
World Junior Figure Skating Championships
International figure skating competitions hosted by Canada